The H-Boat is a strict one-design keelboat designed by Finn Hans Groop in 1967, with some minor modifications by Paul Elvstrøm in 1971. The boat gained international status in 1977. Since 1967 over 5000 hulls have been made, making it one of the most popular yacht classes in the world. The boat is mostly sailed and raced in Nordic countries and Central Europe, although there are a few boats in the UK and the US.

The official race crew consists of three persons. Women and juniors are allowed to have a fourth crew member in competitions. The H-boat has sleeping bunks for up to four persons. As a cruising yacht, the boat is suitable for 2-5 persons.

Major manufacturers of H-Boats have been Eagle Marine (Finland), Elvstrøm (Denmark), Scanboat (Åland), Hydrospeed (Finland), Artekno (Finland), Botnia Marin (Finland), O.L. Boats (Denmark), Ott Yacht (Germany) and Frauscher (Austria).

History
The Hans Groop-designed H-boat won a Finnish design competition for a GRP one-design fleet racer with spinnaker in 1967 and production started in 1970 by the Finnish builder Artekno. The H in the name H-boat came from the Greek mythology goddess Hestia. During the first three years, 500 boats were sold. In 1971, Elvstrøm started production of the H-boat with some modifications on rudder and mast and in 1977 Botnia.

Events

World Championships

The H-boat World Championships has been sailed since 1980.

References

External links

Official Eagle Marine webpage
Official OTT webpage

 
Keelboats
1960s sailboat type designs
Sailboat types built in Denmark
Sailboat types built in Finland
Sailboat types built in Austria
Sailboat types built in Germany
Sailboat type designs by Finnish designers